Parachma lequettealis is a moth of subfamily Chrysauginae in the genus Parachma. It was described by Christian Guillermet in 2011, and is found in Gabon, Mauritius, Nigeria, Réunion, French Guiana and Peru.

References

Moths described in 2011
Chrysauginae
Moths of Africa